In Slovenia, the standard time is Central European Time (CET; UTC+01:00). Daylight saving time is observed from the last Sunday in March (02:00 CET) to the last Sunday in October (03:00 CEST). This is shared with several other EU member states.

History 
The Austro-Hungarian Empire adopted CET on 1 October 1891. Slovenia would continue to observe CET after independence, and observed daylight saving time between 1941 to 1946, and again since 1983.

Notation 
Slovenia uses both the 12-hour and 24-hour clock.

IANA time zone database 
In the IANA time zone database, Slovenia is given one zone in the file zone.tab – Europe/Ljubljana. Data for Slovenia directly from zone.tab of the IANA time zone database; columns marked with * are the columns from zone.tab itself:

See also 
Time in Europe
List of time zones by country
List of time zones by UTC offset

References

External links 
Time in Slovenia at TimeAndDate.com.